Padegan Nazami Shahrabad (also Romanized as Pādegān Naẓāmī Shahrābād) is a village in Jeyransu Rural District, in the Central District of Maneh and Samalqan County, North Khorasan Province, Iran. At the 2006 census, its population was 886, in 281 families.

References 

Populated places in Maneh and Samalqan County